The Goya Award for Best Art Direction (Spanish: Premio Goya a la mejor dirección artística) is one of the Goya Awards, Spain's principal national film awards. The category was first presented at the first editiong of the Goya Awards with Félix Murcia being the first winner of the award for his work in Dragon Rapide (1986).

Félix Murcia holds the record of the most awards in this category with five followed by Gil Parrondo with four wins.

Winners and nominees

1980s

1990s

2000s

2010s

2020s

References

External links
Official site
IMDb: Goya Awards

Goya Awards